Homenetmen Sports Association Lebanon is a Lebanese-Armenian multi-sports club and scouting movement. Established in 1924, it is part of the worldwide pan-Armenian Homenetmen organization.

Homenetmen Lebanon has had teams in various national leagues, most notably in association football, basketball, track and field, table tennis, and cycling, among others.

History 
Lebanon's branch of the Homenetmen organisation was founded in 1924 in Beirut. They first established a football team, who first won the Lebanese Premier League in the 1943–44 season. Homenetmen was closely affiliated with the Tashnag party. Homenetmen Beirut were one of the most prominent football teams, winning the league title seven times.

Following the Lebanese Civil War, the club fell into dismay; they were relegated to the Lebanese Second Division for the first time in 2002, and to the Lebanese Third Division in 2005. Ever since, the organisation shifted its focus away from football to indoor sports.

Branches 
The organisation has eight branches in different locations in Lebanon: Beirut, Tripoli, Jounieh, Bourj Hammoud, Anjar, Zahlé,  and Jdeideh.
 Homenetmen Antelias
 Homenetmen Beirut
 Football
 Basketball
 Homenetmen Bourj Hammoud

References 

Homenetmen Lebanon
Sport in Beirut
1924 establishments in Lebanon
Tennis teams
Armenian-Lebanese culture
Scouting and Guiding in Lebanon
Diaspora sports clubs